Matrimony is a lost 1915 silent film drama directed by Scott Sidney and starring Julia Dean. It was produced by Thomas H. Ince and distributed by the Triangle Film Corporation.

Cast
Julia Dean - Diana Rossmore
Howard C. Hickman - Weston Rossmore
Thelma Salter - Viola
Louise Glaum - Thelma Iverson
Betty Burbridge - Antoinette
Lou Salter - Nurse (unconfirmed)

References

External links
Matrimony at IMDb.com

1915 films
American silent feature films
Lost American films
American black-and-white films
Silent American drama films
1915 drama films
Films directed by Scott Sidney
1910s American films